The Hansa-Brandenburg GDW was a floatplane torpedo bomber built in Germany during World War I for the Imperial German Navy.

Design and development
Although similar to the Hansa-Brandenburg GW, it was larger and used Benz Bz.IV engines. Although a prototype was built in the second half of 1916, the German Navy lost interest in the slow-moving torpedo bomber idea, so the GDW did not enter production on order from German command.

Specifications (GDW)

References

Bibliography

1910s German bomber aircraft
GDW
Floatplanes
Biplanes
Twin piston-engined tractor aircraft
Aircraft first flown in 1916